Propionitrile, also known as ethyl cyanide and propanenitrile, is an organic compound with the formula CH3CH2CN.  It is a simple aliphatic nitrile.  The compound is a colourless, water-soluble liquid.  It is used as a solvent and a precursor to other organic compounds.

Production
The main industrial route to this nitrile is the hydrogenation of acrylonitrile.  It is also prepared by the ammoxidation of propanol (propionaldehyde can also be used instead):
CH3CH2CH2OH  +  O2  +  NH3   →   CH3CH2CN  +  3 H2O
Propionitrile is a byproduct of the electrodimerisation of acrylonitrile to adiponitrile.

In the laboratory propanenitrile can also be produced by the dehydration of propionamide, by catalytic reduction of acrylonitrile, or by distilling ethyl sulfate and potassium cyanide.

Applications

Propionitrile is a solvent similar to acetonitrile but with a slightly higher boiling point.  It is a precursor to propylamines by hydrogenation.  It is a C-3 building block in the preparation of the drug flopropione by the Houben-Hoesch reaction.

The nitrile aldol reaction with benzophenone, followed by reduction of the nitrile with lithium aluminium hydride gives 2-MDP. This agent possesses appetite suppressant and antidepressant properties.

Safety
The toxicity  of propionitrile is listed as 39 mg/kg and as 230 my (both rats, oral).

In 1979, the Kalama (Vega) plant in Beaufort, South Carolina experienced an explosion during the production of propionitrile by nickel-catalyzed hydrogenation of acrylonitrile.  This site is now one of the two Superfund cleanup sites in South Carolina.

References

External links
 NIST Chemistry WebBook for C3H5N
 CDC - NIOSH Pocket Guide to Chemical Hazards

3
Solvents